Frank C. Byers (20 June 1883 – 27 April 1962) was an American lawyer and politician.

Byers was born in Alden, Iowa, on 20 June 1883. After graduating from high school in Alden, he attended Grinnell College and the University of Iowa College of Law. He passed the bar exam in 1904 and began practicing law the next year, in Cedar Rapids. Byers was also an assistant city attorney and assistant county attorney. Byers was affiliated with the Republican Party. Between 1924 and 1933, he served on the Cedar Rapids school board, including one year, 1927–1928, as board president. In 1928, Byers was elected to his first term on the Iowa House of Representatives for District 48. After concluding his second term as state representative in 1933, Byers was seated to the Iowa Senate for District 26. He retired in January 1961 as the longest continually serving Iowa state legislator.

In October 1909, Byers married Myra Lyon, with whom he raised two sons, Ganson and Frank Jr., and a daughter. Katherine. Katherine married Alden D. Avery, the son of Amplias Hale Avery, a legislative colleague of Byers'. Frank C. Byers died at the age of 78 on 27 April 1962.

References

20th-century American politicians
20th-century American lawyers
1883 births
1962 deaths
Iowa city attorneys
Republican Party Iowa state senators
Republican Party members of the Iowa House of Representatives
School board members in Iowa
Politicians from Cedar Rapids, Iowa
People from Hardin County, Iowa
Grinnell College alumni
University of Iowa College of Law alumni
District attorneys in Iowa